Goussi is a village in the province of Nayala in Burkina Faso. 
Goussi has a population of 516.

References

Nayala Province
Populated places in the Boucle du Mouhoun Region